Halyini is a tribe of stink bugs in the family Pentatomidae. The tribe has been described as a "dumping ground" for numerous genera, many of which have been removed to other tribes. Databases like BugGuide, Integrated Taxonomic Information System, and Encyclopedia of Life record one genus and at least 20 described species in Halyini. More recent revisions such as that presented in Invasive Stink Bugs and Related Species (Pentatomoidea) (2018), indicate multiple genera in Halyini.

Genera 
The following genera are included within Halyini, as of the 2018 revision presented by McPherson:

 Agaeus 
 Anchises 
 Apodiphus 
 Atelocera 
 Auxentius
 Babylas 
 Brizica 
 Brochymena 
 Cahara
 Carenoplistus
 Ectenus
 Elemana
 Epitoxicorus 
 Eurus
 Faizuda
 Goilalaka
 Halys
 Jugalpada
 Mimikana
 Parabrochymena 
 Paranevisanus 
 Phricodus
 Platycoris
 Poecilmetis
 Polycarmes
 Pseudatelus 
 Sarju
 Solomonius 
 Tachengia
 Theseus
 Tinganina
 Tipulparra
 Zaplutus

References

Further reading

 
 
 

 
Pentatominae
Hemiptera tribes